Élcio Álvares (28 September 1932 – 9 December 2016) was a Brazilian politician.

He was a Federal Deputy for the Brazilian Chamber of Deputies for the State of Espírito Santo (1970–1975), Governor of the State of Espírito Santo (1975–1979), Senator (1991–1994; 1995–1999), Minister of Commerce (1994) during the Franco administration, and Minister of Defence (1999–2000) during the Cardoso government.

References

External links 
 Senate of Brazil Biography of Sen. Élcio Álvares

1932 births
2016 deaths
Defence ministers of Brazil
Governors of Espírito Santo
Members of the Chamber of Deputies (Brazil) from Espírito Santo
Members of the Federal Senate (Brazil)
Members of the Legislative Assembly of Espírito Santo
Recipients of the Great Cross of the National Order of Scientific Merit (Brazil)